The 2011 Sagan Tosu season was Sagan Tosu's 13th season in J.League Division 2. Sagan Tosu were promoted to the 2012 J.League Division 1. Sagan Tosu were knocked out in the second round of the 2011 Emperor's Cup.

Players

Competitions

J. League

League table

Matches

Emperor's Cup

References

Sagan Tosu
2011